Dale Roger Coogan (August 14, 1930 – March 8, 1989) was an American professional baseball player who appeared in 53 games in the Major Leagues as a first baseman for the Pittsburgh Pirates in .

He signed with the Pirates in 1948 after attending Washington High School and made the big-league Pirates after two seasons in their farm system. He notched his first hit on April 29, 1950, by singling off Eddie Erautt of the Cincinnati Reds at Crosley Field.  Other highlights included a four-hit game on May 30 against the St. Louis Cardinals and his only big-league home run, a three-run blast off Ralph Branca in a game suspended by rain that began June 24 and finished August 1. Coogan's belt happened during the June contest, but by August 1, he was back in the minor leagues. The Brooklyn Dodgers eventually won the game, 21–12.

During his three-month tenure in the National League in 1950, Coogan registered 31 hits, with six doubles and one triple accompanying his one home run.  He continued his playing career in the minors through 1958, including brief service with his hometown 
Hollywood Stars of the Pacific Coast League in 1951.

Coogan attended college during the off-seasons of his baseball career, and earned bachelor's and master's degrees from Long Beach State University, and a doctorate from the University of Southern California. He was a teacher or administrator with three Southern California public school districts, and was superintendent of the Ocean View Elementary School District at the time of his death, at 58, from cancer in Mission Viejo, California.

References

External links

1930 births
1989 deaths
Baseball players from Los Angeles
Deaths from cancer in California
California State University, Long Beach alumni
Hollywood Stars players
Indianapolis Indians players
Keokuk Pirates players
Major League Baseball first basemen
New Orleans Pelicans (baseball) players
Pittsburgh Pirates players
Shreveport Sports players
USC Rossier School of Education alumni
Victoria Rosebuds players
Williamsport Grays players